Lick Branch is a  long 2nd order tributary to Sandy Creek in Pittsylvania County, Virginia.

Course 
Lick Branch rises about 2 miles west of Red Oak Hollow, Virginia in Pittsylvania County and then flows northeast to join Sandy Creek about 1 mile south of Pickaway.

Watershed 
Lick Branch drains  of area, receives about 45.6 in/year of precipitation, has a wetness index of 372.40, and is about 54% forested.

See also 
 List of Virginia Rivers

References 

Rivers of Pittsylvania County, Virginia
Rivers of Virginia